Innisfail was a territorial electoral district in Northwest Territories, Canada, mandated to return a single member to the Legislative Assembly of the Northwest Territories from 1902 to 1905.|

History
The district was named after the Town of Innisfail.

Innisfail would continue as the Innisfail electoral district, one of the 25 original electoral districts contested in the 1905 Alberta general election upon Alberta joining Confederation in September 1905.

Election results 1902

See also
Innisfail electoral district an Alberta provincial electoral district from 1905 to 1940 and again from 1971 to 1993
Innisfail a town in central Alberta

References

Former electoral districts of Northwest Territories